Katarzyna Iwona Jurkowska-Kowalska (born 18 February 1992) is a Polish artistic gymnast and a two-time Polish all-around champion. She represented Poland at the 2016 Summer Olympic Games in Rio de Janeiro.

Career
She represented Poland at the World Artistic Gymnastics Championships in 2007, 2009, 2010, 2014 and 2015. In 2016, she competed at the Olympic Test Event, where she received a qualification for the 2016 Summer Olympics. 
Her biggest international accomplishments are 5th place on the balance beam at the 2013 European Championships in Moscow and 8th place on vault at the 2016 European Championships in Bern. 
She also won multiple medals at the World Cup series.

Eponymous skills
Jurkowska-Kowalska has two eponymous skills listed in the Code of Points.

Family
She is married to Arkadiusz Kowalski, a professional handball player. On September 3, 2019, she gave birth to a son.

References

External links
https://thegymter.net/katarzyna-jurkowska/
http://olympians.pointafter.com/l/47461/Katarzyna-Jurkowska-kowalska
http://www.gettyimages.com/pictures/katarzyna-jurkowska-kowalska-14696331#katarzyna-jurkowskakowalska-of-poland-competes-on-the-balance-beam-picture-id587143646
http://www.zimbio.com/photos/Katarzyna+Jurkowska-+Kowalska/Gymnastics+Artistic+Olympics+Day+2/XAZS8Re-cVt
https://www.youtube.com/watch?v=2FduHtILGJ8

1992 births
Living people
Polish female artistic gymnasts
Gymnasts at the 2015 European Games
European Games competitors for Poland
Gymnasts at the 2016 Summer Olympics
Olympic gymnasts of Poland
Sportspeople from Kraków
Originators of elements in artistic gymnastics